The Sino-Spanish Association for Energy and Sustainability (ASEES) is a Spanish non-profit organization founded in 2009 by Cosme de Arana  for the promotion of bilateral cooperation between China and Spain in the renewable energy and environment sectors. It aims to build a bridge between the two countries to promote commercial and technological exchange.

Overview 
The Sino-Spanish Association for Energy and Sustainability works in China in contact with stakeholders from the private sector, academia, NGOs, and government to promote sustainable development through international cooperation, exchange of information and knowledge sharing between Europe and China, as well as identify business opportunities. ASEES acts as a ‘Think tank’, analyzing the evolution of the sector, looking for opportunities and preparing market intelligence reports.

ASEES opens a direct channel between Spain and China to share knowledge and technology in sectors where Spain has an innovative and competitive leadership. This collaborative platform offers China the tools it needs to undertake urgent reforms in its development model and achieve a more sustainable future.

ASEES Report 

ASEES Report. Business Opportunities in China: Renewable Energy and Environment is an extensive research which analyzes in detail the areas of renewable energy, energy efficiency, environment and green transport and construction in China.

Published by ASEES in 2012, it is the first report about green energy and sustainability in China written in Spanish. It is a guide for those green companies that are looking to China as a great business opportunity.

DETAILS
Format: PDF Secure
Language: Spanish
Pages: 352
Figures: 114
Tables: 68

References

External links 
 Official Website 

Non-profit organisations based in Spain
Organizations established in 2009
Environmental organisations based in Spain